Associazione Sportiva Ippogrifo Sarno Associazione Sportiva Dilettante is an Italian association football club located in Sarno, Campania.

It currently plays in Serie D. Its colors are all-maroon.

Name

The club takes its name from the mythical Hippogriff.

References

Football clubs in Campania
1989 establishments in Italy